Orcinus meyeri is a fossil species of Orcinus (killer whales) found in the Early Miocene deposits of southern Germany, known from two jaw fragments and 18 isolated teeth. It was originally described as Delphinus acutidens in 1859, but reclassified in 1873. Its validity is disputed, and it may be a synonymous with the ancient sperm whale Physeterula dubusi. It was found in the Alpine town of Stockach in the Molasse basin, which was a coastal area with strong tidal currents.

Taxonomy
The remains of Orcinus meyeri was first described in 1859 by German paleontologist Christian Erich Hermann von Meyer as an ancient common dolphin, Delphinus acutidens, based on two jaw fragments and some isolated teeth found near the south German town of Stockach. He also suggested the names Delphinus (Beluga) acutidens and D. (Orcopsis) acutidens. The species name acutidens derives from Latin acutus "sharp" and dens "teeth". In 1873, German naturalist Johann Friedrich von Brandt gave it the species name meyeri, citing "acutidens" as being inaccurate given the apparent bluntness of the teeth, and placed it into the same genus as the killer whale (Orcinus orca), which at the time was Orca, given the similarity of the teeth, reclassifying the whale as Orca meyeri. The remains were then kept in the Stuttgart Museum of Natural History. In 1898, Swiss marine biologist Théophile Rudolphe Studer said O. meyeri was a subjective synonym of Delphinus acutidens, and there is room for debate on the question of the former's validity. In 1904, French zoologist Édouard Louis Trouessart replaced Orca with Orcinus and described the whale as Orcinus meyeri. In 1905, Austrian paleobiologist Othenio Abel considered D. acutidens to be synonymous with the sperm whale Physeterula dubusi, however he was unsure if O. meyeri was also a synonym.

Description
The animal in life would probably have had 48 conical teeth in total, in comparison to the modern killer whale (O. orca) which has 40 to 56. The teeth of O. meyeri are distinct from the modern killer whale by having two vertical grooves originating at the tip.

Paleoecology
The Orcinus lineage, like many other predatory marine lineages, may have fished up the food chain and progressively evolved to eat bigger and bigger food items, with Pliocene killer whales able to hunt large fish, and the modern killer whale able to hunt large whales.

Stockach is situated in the Molasse basin, which dates to the Early Miocene, and was submerged in the Western Paratethys Sea. Central Europe, at this time, probably represented an upwelling area along a continental shelf, which attracted a variety of sea life, including swarming fish. Land was probably dominated by nearshore swamps which emptied into the sea, and the area featured ancient beavers, hedgehogs, several river turtle species, and various other semi-aquatic creatures. The sea progressively moved southwards, and the connection to the ocean closed about 17 million years ago (mya), turning the area into a system of brackish and freshwater lakes.

See also 

Orcinus citoniensis
Orcinus paleorca

References 

Cetacean genera
Orcas
Miocene cetaceans
Miocene mammals of Europe
Fossil taxa described in 1873
Nomina dubia